Krystyna Jakubowska-Tabaka (born 15 December 1942) is a former Polish volleyball player, a member of Poland women's national volleyball team in 1961–1969, a bronze medalist of the Olympic Games (Tokyo 1964, Mexico 1968), a bronze medalist of the World Championship 1962 and silver medalist of the European Championship (1963, 1967).

Career as player

National team
In 1962 she won bronze medal of World Championship, and one year later silver of European Championship 1963. In 1964 she took part in Olympic Games Tokyo 1964. She played in all five matches and Poland, including Jakubowska, won bronze medal in the Olympic tournament and four years later she repeated this success at Olympics 1968. In 1967 she achieved another silver of European Championship. She played in national team 169 times.

External links
 

1942 births
Living people
Polish women's volleyball players
Volleyball players from Warsaw
Volleyball players at the 1964 Summer Olympics
Volleyball players at the 1968 Summer Olympics
Olympic volleyball players of Poland
Olympic medalists in volleyball
Olympic bronze medalists for Poland
Medalists at the 1968 Summer Olympics
Medalists at the 1964 Summer Olympics